Cecilia Hjortsberg is a Swedish opera singer (soprano), born 1973.

She has been employed at The Royal Theatre, Copenhagen since 2005. Previous employment was at Malmö Opera and Music Theatre, where she has contributed in Miss Saigon, Otello, Turandot, La Bohème and Faust and played Donna Anna in Don Giovanni by Skånska Operan, 2005.

Education
She attended the Royal College of Music of Stockholm, Chamber music program, and then the Opera Studio at the Gothenburg Opera.

Opera Roles
 Starring role as the witch in Hans och Greta
 Isis in Naumanns Osiris, production by the Malmö lyrical ensemble
 Donna Anna in Mozarts Don Giovanni, production by the Opera of Skåne
 Georgetta in Puccinis Il tabarro, production by the Opera i Provinsen
 Desdemona in Verdis Othello, Production by the Opera i Provinsen, performed at Takkeloftet at The Royal Danish Opera
 Second Water nymph in Dvořák's Rusalka, production by the Royal Danish Opera
 Voice from above in Don Carlos, production by the Royal Danish Opera
 Cover for the role "Stövlet-katrine" in Bo Holten's Livläkarens Besök
 Fiordiligi in Così fan tutte
 Emperor Augustus in Tiberius prövningar

Sources
 Ohlsson, Matilda, Operasångerska som gillar hårdrock, Blekinge Läns Tidning, 30 December 2009
 Söderbom, Emma, Cecilia från Karlskrona bor mitt i gängkriget, Sydöstran, 5 March 2009

1973 births
Living people
Swedish operatic sopranos
21st-century Swedish singers
21st-century Swedish women singers